Halil Sezai Erkut (1908–1988) was a Turkish government minister and politician. He was a member of the Constituent Assembly of Turkey in 1961, immediately following the 1960 Turkish coup d'état. In 1963 he was elected mayor of Ankara; he served for one term until 1968.

A street in Ankara is named after him.

References 

1908 births
1988 deaths
20th-century Turkish politicians
People from Kırşehir
Place of death missing
Mayors of Ankara
Members of the Constituent Assembly of Turkey
Republican People's Party (Turkey) politicians